Melisa Teo (born 5 February 1975) is a Singaporean photographer living and working in Paris. For many years, she focused her camera on religious subjects but nature is now the central theme of her photography.

Career 

From 2008 to 2011,Teo documented her journey through the worlds of Buddhism, Hinduism and Santeria in Asia and Latin America, attempting to understand spirituality and the role of the divine through religion and faith.

The result was contrasted with the photographs of the late Franco-Iranian photographer Abbas in a work called Dark Light. It was also published in a book called Light From Within (Canvas, Singapore 2012)/ Lumière Surgie de l'Intérieur (Les Éditions du Pacifique, Paris, 2012). 

In 2013, Teo participated in 7 Days in Myanmar, a book and multi-media project involving 30 photographers, each documenting a different region of Myanmar over the same seven days.

From 2014 to 2016, she travelled from Vietnam to Laos, Taiwan to Israel, Morocco to France shifting her focus from searching for spirituality in religious rites and rituals to finding it in everyday life, resulting in the work The Light Beyond. In the same year, with the project Eden, Teo turned to nature as the central theme of her work. 

From 2018 to 2019, she photographed the trees of Paris, focusing on man's intuitive rapport with nature. This work is published in Les Arbres de Paris/The Trees of Paris(Les Éditions du Pacifique, Paris, 2020), with foreword by the French author Sylvain Tesson. Teo also manages Fonds Abbas Photos which protects, preserves and promotes the oeuvre and heritage of the Magnum photographer Abbas, who passed away in 2018. 

In 2022, she was the subject of a documentary film in the television series Find Me a Singaporean, featuring her work and life in Paris.  

Prior to photography, Teo worked in book publishing.

Publications 

 Dark Light (exhibition catalogue), published by 2902 Gallery, Singapore, 2011
  Light From Within with afterword by Abbas, published by Canvas, Singapore, 2012
 Lumière Surgie de l’Intérieur (French edition of Light From Within), published by Les Editions du Pacifique, Paris, 2012
 The Light Beyond (exhibition catalogue) with text by Parisa Reza, published by The Arts House, Singapore, 2016
 Les Arbres de Paris/The Trees of Paris with foreword by Sylvain Tesson, published by Les Editions du Pacifique, Paris, 2020

Solo exhibitions 

 2012: Light From Within, Cathay Gallery, Singapore
 2012: Light From Within, JAS Gallery, Paris 
 2016: The Light Beyond, The Arts House, Singapore
 2016: Eden, Chan + Hori Contemporary Gallery, Singapore
2020-2021: Les Arbres de Paris/The Trees of Paris, la galerie, Alliance Française de Singapour, part of Voilah! France Singapore Festival and Singapore Art Week
2022: Les Arbres de Paris/巴黎的树, Yellow Crane Tower, Wuhan, China, part of Croisements France China Cultural Festival
2022: Les Arbres de Paris/巴黎的树, Le Châlet Art Museum, Wuhan, China

Joint and group exhibitions 

 2011: Dark Light with photographer Abbas, 2902 Gallery, Singapore
 2013: 7 Days in Myanmar by 30 Great Photographers, Chatrium Yangon, Myanmar
 2017: Art Stage, presented by Marc de Puechredon Gallery Basel, Singapore
 2022: Look Up, presented by Intersections Gallery at EHL Campus, Singapore

Filmography 

 2022: Find Me a Singaporean, Ep. 6 (produced by Threesixzero Productions and broadcast on Channel U)

References 

1975 births
Living people
Fine art photographers
Conceptual photographers
Singaporean photographers
Singaporean artists
Singaporean women photographers
Singaporean people of Chinese descent